This is a list of television channels that broadcast in Croatian.

Croatia

Bosnia and Herzegovina 

 RTV Herceg-Bosne - from Mostar, seen in Bosnia and Herzegovina
 Posavina TV - from Brčko, seen in Posavina
 OTV Valentino - private channel, seen in Posavina

Partially broadcast in Croatian

 BHRT - public channel, seen in Bosnia and Herzegovina
 Federalna TV - public channel, seen in Federation of BiH
 OBN Televizija - private channel, seen in Bosnia and Herzegovina
 Al Jazeera Balkans - news channel seen in Bosnia and Herzegovina

Croatian
Television channels
Television